Lucian H. Palmer (March 12, 1855February 17, 1923) was an American politician and businessman.  He was the first African American elected to the Wisconsin Legislature.  A Republican, he served one term in the Wisconsin State Assembly (from 1907 to 1909) representing Milwaukee County's 6th assembly district—downtown Milwaukee.  His first name is sometimes spelled Lucien in historical documents.

Biography
Lucian Palmer was born in Huntsville, Alabama, in the years just before the American Civil War.  At age seven, he was left without parents.  Several years later, he moved with his older sister to Nashville, Tennessee, where he attended public schools.  He worked and paid his way through Central Tennessee College, where he graduated in 1876.

After graduating from college, he was hired at the Grand Pacific Hotel in Chicago, and later became manager of Lakeside Resort in Pewaukee, Wisconsin.  He ran his own catering business from 1883 until the Panic of 1893.  Afterward, he became a steward at the Milwaukee Yacht Club.  He resigned to become superintendent and steward of the Wisconsin building at the St. Louis World's Fair, in 1904.  Following the exposition, he returned to Milwaukee and was hired as steward of the Pasadena Flats.

In 1906, he ran as a Progressive Republican for the Wisconsin State Assembly and won a shocking victory over incumbent Democrat Thomas F. Ramsey.  Newspapers at the time marveled at the "peculiar incident" of the "first colored man to go to the state legislature".  It was also noted that, at the time, Palmer represented the wealthiest district in the state.

During his one term in the Assembly, Palmer served on the Assembly committees on public health and on federal relations.  In the latter capacity, he fought for a resolution on the Brownsville affair, requesting a more thorough investigation of the events.  The incident involved accusations against the African American United States Army soldiers in the 25th Infantry Regiment, stationed at Fort Brown, near Brownsville.  After the initial investigation, President Theodore Roosevelt ordered 167 African American men of the regiment to be dishonorably discharged.  A more thorough investigation did eventually occur, allowing several of the men to re-enlist.

Although he sought renomination in 1908, the Republicans instead nominated Chauncey W. Yockey, who went on to lose the general election to Thomas F. Ramsey, who reclaimed his seat.

Outside of politics, he was a trustee at St. Mark African Methodist Episcopal Church in Milwaukee, and a Freemason.

He died at his home in Milwaukee on February 17, 1923. The Wisconsin Assembly issued a resolution in his honor on February 27, 1923.

Electoral history

Wisconsin Assembly (1906)

| colspan="6" style="text-align:center;background-color: #e9e9e9;"| General Election, November 6, 1906

References

External links
 Lucian H. Palmer at Wisconsin Historical Society
 St. Mark AME Church at Wisconsin Historical Society
 St. Mark A.M.E. Church

1855 births
1923 deaths
Republican Party members of the Wisconsin State Assembly
20th-century American politicians
African-American state legislators in Wisconsin
Politicians from Huntsville, Alabama
Politicians from Milwaukee
Walden University (Tennessee) alumni
20th-century African-American politicians
African-American men in politics